Paremhat 23 - Coptic Calendar - Paremhat 25

The twenty-fourth day of the Coptic month of Paremhat, the seventh month of the Coptic year. In common years, this day corresponds to March 20, of the Julian Calendar, and April 2, of the Gregorian Calendar. This day falls in the Coptic Season of Shemu, the season of the Harvest.

Commemorations

Saints 

 The departure of Pope Macarius I, the 59th Patriarch of the See of Saint Mark

Other commemorations 

 The apparition of the Virgin Saint Mary on her Church in Zeitoun

References 

Days of the Coptic calendar